Optical chip may refer to:
 An integrated circuit that acts as the electrical-optical interface for fiber-optic communication
 A vision chip which combines optical sensors and computation
 A chip used in optical computing
 A photonic integrated circuit
 A chip that uses an optical interconnect